La Sierra is a town and municipality in the Cauca Department, Colombia.

Climate
La Sierra has a subtropical highland climate (Köppen Cfb) with pleasant mornings and warm afternoons year-round, accompanied by moderate to little rainfall from June to September and heavy to very heavy rainfall from October to May.

References

Municipalities of Cauca Department